The Royal Regiment of Canada is a Primary Reserve infantry regiment of the Canadian Army. The regiment is based in Toronto, Ontario, and forms part of the 4th Canadian Division's 32 Canadian Brigade Group. 

The ceremonial dress uniform of the Royal Regiment of Canada is the scarlet tunic and bearskin, similar to that of the British Army's Grenadier Guards. The plume is red over white, similar to the former Canadian Guards regiment.

Lineage

Royal Grenadiers

Originated 21 December 1861 in Toronto, Ontario as The Toronto Engineers and Mechanics Rifle Corps
First official designation 14 March 1862 as the 10th Battalion Volunteer Militia Rifles, Canada
Redesignated 21 November 1862 as the 10th Battalion Volunteer Militia (Infantry), Canada
Redesignated 10 April 1863 as the Tenth or "Royal Regiment of Toronto Volunteers"
Reorganized 5 November 1880 with the appointment of Colonel Grasett and retirement of Colonel Shaw
Redesignated 5 August 1881 as the 10th Battalion "Royal Grenadiers"
Redesignated 8 May 1900 as the 10th Regiment "Royal Grenadiers"
Served in the Great War as the 123rd Battalion, Royal Grenadiers, and supplied trained hundreds of infantry officers and men to several Canadian Battalions
Redesignated 1 May 1920 as The Royal Grenadiers
Amalgamated 15 December 1936 with The Toronto Regiment

The Toronto Regiment

Originated 1 May 1920 in Toronto, Ontario
Formed principally from the 3rd Battalion, Canadian Expeditionary Force (CEF), of the Great War
Amalgamated 15 December 1936 with the Royal Grenadiers.

The Royal Regiment of Canada
Amalgamated 15 December 1936 the Royal Grenadiers with The Toronto Regiment and redesignated as The Royal Regiment of Toronto Grenadiers
Redesignated 11 February 1939 as the Royal Regiment of Canada
Supplemented 7 November 1940 by the formation of the 2nd Battalion, the Royal Regiment of Canada for home service

Chart

Perpetuations

The Great War
3rd Battalion (Toronto Regiment), CEF
58th Battalion, CEF
123rd Battalion (Royal Grenadiers), CEF
124th Battalion (Governor General's Body Guard), CEF
170th Battalion (Mississauga Horse), CEF
204th Battalion (Beavers), CEF

Operational history

The Fenian Raids
The 10th or Royal Regiment of Toronto Volunteers was called out on active service from 8 to 31 March and from 1 to 22 June 1866. The battalion served on the Niagara frontier.

North West Rebellion
The 10th Battalion, Royal Grenadiers was called to arms on 27 March 1885 and turned out in marching order the following day.  The Battalion served with Middleton's column of the North West Field Force, until they returned from active service on 24 July 1885. The 10th Royals saw action at the Battle of Fish Creek (24 April), and the Battle of Batoche (9-12 May).

South African War
The 10th Battalion Royal Grenadiers contributed volunteers for the 2nd (Special Service) Battalion, Royal Canadian Regiment of Infantry during the South African War.

The Great War
Details of the 10th Regiment Royal Grenadiers were placed on active service on 6 August 1914 for local protection duties.

The 3rd Battalion (Toronto Regiment), CEF was authorized on 10 August 1914 and embarked for Great Britain on 26 September 1914. It disembarked in France on 11 February 1915, where it fought as part of the 1st Infantry Brigade, 1st Canadian Division in France and Flanders until the end of the war. The battalion was disbanded on 15 September 1920.

The 58th Battalion, CEF, was authorized on 20 April 1915 and embarked for Great Britain on 22 November 1915. It disembarked in France on 22 February 1916, where it fought as part of the 9th Infantry Brigade, 3rd Canadian Division in France and Flanders until the end of the war. The battalion was disbanded on 15 September 1920. Its battalion history is captured in the book, "Second to None" by Kevin Shackleton.

The 123rd Battalion (Royal Grenadiers), CEF, was authorized on 22 December 1915 and embarked for Great Britain on 7 and 8 August 1916. It was converted to pioneers and redesignated the 123rd Canadian Pioneer Battalion, Royal Grenadiers, CEF on 17 January 1917. It disembarked in France on 10 March 1917, where it served as the Pioneer Battalion of the 3rd Canadian Division in France and Flanders until 25 May 1918, when it was reorganized to form three new Engineering Battalions; the 7th, 8th and 9th Canadian Engineer Battalions, CEF. The battalion was disbanded on 15 September 1920. Its battalion history is chronicled in the book, "One-Two-Three - The Story of the 123rd Battalion, Royal Grenadiers, CEF" by Dan Mowat.

The 124th Battalion (Governor General's Body Guard), CEF, was authorized on 22 December 1915 and embarked for Great Britain on 7 August 1916. It was redesignated the 124th Canadian Pioneer Battalion, CEF, on 17 January 1917. It disembarked in France on 11 March 1917, where it served as part of the 4th Canadian Division in France and Flanders until 26 May 1918, when it was reorganized to form three new Engineering Battalions; the 10th, 11th and 12th Canadian Engineer Battalions, CEF. The battalion was disbanded on 15 September 1920.

The 170th Battalion (Mississauga Horse), CEF, was authorized on 15 July 1916 and embarked for Great Britain on 25 October 1916. On 8 December 1916, its personnel were absorbed by the 169th Battalion (109th Regiment), CEF, to provide reinforcements for the Canadian Corps in the field. The battalion was disbanded on 17 July 1917.

The 204th Battalion (Beavers), CEF, was authorized on 15 July 1916 and embarked for Great Britain on 28 March 1917. On 4 May 1917, its personnel were absorbed by the 2nd Reserve Battalion, CEF, to provide reinforcements for the Canadian Corps in the field. The battalion was disbanded on 17 July 1917.

Second World War
The regiment mobilised the Royal Regiment of Canada, CASF (Canadian Active Service Force), for active service on 1 September 1939. It embarked for garrison duty in Iceland with "Z" Force on 10 June 1940, and on 31 October 1940 it was transferred to Great Britain. It was redesignated the 1st Battalion, the Royal Regiment of Canada, CASF, on 7 November 1940 when a 2nd Battalion was formed to provide reinforcements to the Regiment in Europe. The 1st battalion took part in the raid on Dieppe on 19 August 1942. It landed again in France on 7 July 1944, as part of the 4th Infantry Brigade, 2nd Canadian Infantry Division, and continued to fight in North-West Europe until the end of the war. The 1st battalion was disbanded on 31 December 1945 when it amalgamated with the 2nd Battalion back home.

Raid on Dieppe - Blue Beach
The naval engagement between the small German convoy and the craft carrying No. 3 Commando had alerted the German defenders at Blue Beach. The Royal Regiment of Canada landed near Puys along with three platoons from the Black Watch (Royal Highland Regiment) of Canada and an artillery detachment who were tasked to neutralize machine gun and artillery batteries protecting the Dieppe beach. They were delayed by 20 minutes and the smoke screens that should have hidden their assault had lifted, eliminating the advantage of surprise and darkness lost. The Germans manned their defensive positions in preparation for the landings.  The well emplaced German forces stopped the Canadian forces that did land on the beach. As soon as they reached the shore, the Canadians found themselves pinned against the seawall, unable to advance and having murderous rifle and machine-gun fire rain down from the cliffs above. The Royals suffered severe casualties: of the 556 men in the regiment 200 were killed and 264 captured.

The regiment evolved from the 10th Royal Grenadiers and thus inherited British traditions. The regiment was authorized to wear the distinctive scarlet uniform of the "Guards" on all ceremonial occasions by decree of Queen Victoria. It is also sixth in the order of precedence.

Alliances 
 – The Duke of Lancaster's Regiment (King's Lancashire and Border)
 – The Royal Victoria Regiment

Battle honours
In the list below, battle honours in small capitals are for large operations and campaigns and those in lowercase are for more specific battles. Bold type indicates honours emblazoned on regimental colours.

Band
The Band of The Royal Regiment of Canada is the oldest permanently organised band in the Canadian Army and in the whole of the Canadian Armed Forces. Based at Fort York in Toronto, Ontario, the band has continued to serve its country, province and city in many different roles throughout the world since its formation in 1863.

Some highlights from the band's itinerary are:

 Performances for the Queen Mother, Princess Anne, the Duke of York, Prince Charles and Queen Elizabeth II.
 International commitments include: performances for the United Nations in Cyprus; the Military Musical Pageant, held at Wembley Stadium, in London, England; a command performance for the colonel-in-chief, Prince Charles, Prince of Wales, in the Gardens of Buckingham Palace; and, being selected as the official band to accompany the veterans and the official party to the United Kingdom and France to commemorate the 50th anniversary of the raid on Dieppe 19 August 1942. In the summer of 2006 the band performed at the 16th International Military Band Festival in Kraków, Poland. Recent years have seen the band travel from Gander, Newfoundland and Labrador, to Victoria, British Columbia, with many performances in between (including the launching of the ship the Hector in Pictou, Nova Scotia, The Summerside Tattoo in Prince Edward Island, and the 2000 International Military Festival of Music in Quebec City).

The Royal Regiment of Canada Association
The Royal Regiment of Canada Association consists of former members of the unit.
The Association meets the first Thursday of each month September to June in the Royal Regiment of Canada Warrant Officers and Sergeants Mess in Canadian Forces Armoury, Fort York.
The main goal of the association is to maintain the comradeship and esprit du corps of the regimental family. The Association in 2008 co-ordinated a successful fund-raising campaign aimed at obtaining sufficient stocks of the scarlet and blue full dress of the regiment to enable the majority of its personnel to parade in this traditional uniform on ceremonial occasions.

The Museum of The Royal Regiment of Canada

The museum preserves and displays the history of the Royal Regiment of Canada and its several predecessors for the benefit of both the members of the regiment and the public at large. The museum is affiliated with: CMA, CHIN, OMMC and Virtual Museum of Canada. The regiment's museum is located at the Fort York Armoury. Exhibits include weapons, uniforms, medals, photographs and artifacts about the history of the Royal Regiment of Canada and its predecessors – the 10th Royal Grenadiers, 3rd Battalion (Toronto Regiment) and 123rd, 124th, 204th and 58th Battalions, Canadian Expeditionary Force. The museum offers displays and school tours by appointment.

Fort York Armoury
Home of the Royal Regiment of Canada
 660 Fleet Street West, Toronto, ON M5V 1A9

Order of precedence

See also

 The Canadian Crown and the Canadian Forces
 List of Canadian organizations with royal patronage
 List of armouries in Canada
 Military history of Canada
 History of the Canadian Army
 Canadian Forces

Notes and references

Books

Fiction
 —Historical/Fiction novel about the 58th Battalion, CEF in Ypres, Belgium.

CD
The Royal Regiment of Canada Band "O Canada" Music CD audio (S.l.: Mastersound, ©1998)

External links

History and Uniform of The Royal Regiment of Canada, 1862 to 1970
The Royal Regiment of Canada Museum
The Royal Regiment of Canada Association

Royal Regiment of Canada
Infantry regiments of Canada
Infantry regiments of Canada in World War II
Military units and formations established in 1936
Museums in Toronto
Regimental museums in Canada
Military units and formations of Ontario
Military units and formations of Canada in World War II